The Copa Bicentenario is a football competition in Peru played by the football clubs of the Liga 1 and Liga 2. It was founded in 2019 and was played as a domestic football cup competition between clubs of the first and second division.

History

2019
Due to the 2019 Copa América, at the end of the 2019 Liga 1's Apertura, the Copa Bicentenario will be played, with the participation of the 18 teams of the Liga 1, and 12 teams of the Liga 2. The winners qualified for the 2020 Copa Sudamericana.

2020
The Copa Bicentenario was canceled due to the COVID-19 pandemic''.

2022
On August 23, it was announced that the Copa Bicentenario was canceled due to the reforms of Peruvian football by the FPF.

Champions

Titles by club

Titles by region

Topscorers

References

External links
Soccerway.com
Peruvian Football League News 

Football competitions in Peru
Peru
Recurring sporting events established in 2019